Johnny Trouble is a 1957 American drama film directed by John H. Auer and written by Charles O'Neil and David Lord. The film stars Ethel Barrymore in her final film, Cecil Kellaway, Stuart Whitman, Carolyn Jones, Jesse White and Rand Harper. The film was released by Warner Bros. on September 24, 1957.

Plot
For 27 years, the wealthy invalid Katherine Chandler has been waiting for her missing son John to return to her. A nearby college buys her apartment building and intends to evict her and construct a men's dormitory, but Katherine has a lease that stipulates she cannot be moved without her consent.

Workmen begin the construction all around her unit, but rather than drive her away, Katherine charms the young men and invites them for tea. Assisted by her longtime chauffeur Tom McKay, she is carried up and down the stairs in her chair by the workers and students.

One night, a young woman named Julie Horton breaks in through the fire escape. Julie is having trouble with her boyfriend Johnny, a former Marine who is now in school.  Katherine wants to meet him. She begins to wonder if this could be the son of her long-lost Johnny and quickly begins to enjoy his company and trust him.

Johnny's grades and behavior are poor, resulting in him being expelled. Katherine goes to the university's administrators to say if they will give Johnny a second chance, she will vacate her premises. They agree.

Johnny does better in school. Despite passing all of his courses, Johnny decides to drop out of school to support Julie who is now pregnant until she has the baby and places it up for adoption. After speaking to Katherine, Johnny has a change of heart and marries Julie while also deciding against dropping out.  The newly married couple decide to find an off campus apartment, where they will live with Katherine.

Katherine feels as if she has a family again. That night, she dies in her sleep. All the workmen and students come to her funeral, where Tom explains that her son Johnny was actually killed in a car crash 27 years ago, but Katherine's late husband made Tom promise never to tell her, giving her hope that he might still be out there somewhere.

Cast  

Ethel Barrymore as Katherine Chandler 
Cecil Kellaway as Tom McKay
Stuart Whitman as Johnny Chandler
Carolyn Jones as Julie Horton
Jesse White as Parsons
Rand Harper as Phil Wilson
Paul Wallace as Paul Parker
Edd Byrnes as Elliott 
Edward Castagna as Giuseppe (Tex) Costanza
Nino Tempo as Charlie Horne
James Bridges as Ike 
Paul Lukather as Bill
James Bell as Reverend Harrington
Samuel Colt as Mr. Reichow
Kip King as Kip King
Gavin Muir as Madden
Jack Larson as Eddie Landis

See also
Ethel Barrymore on stage, screen and radio

References

External links 
 

1957 films
1950s English-language films
Warner Bros. films
American drama films
1957 drama films
Films directed by John H. Auer
Films scored by Frank De Vol
1950s American films

Films set in universities and colleges
Films about families
Films about disability in the United States